During his pontificate, Pope Leo XIII wrote twelve encyclicals on the Rosary.

The first such encyclical was Supremi apostolatus officio of September 1883. Most were issued in September in anticipation of October, which Leo would have dedicated to special devotion to Mary, in particular through the Rosary. The last one is Diuturni temporis.

List 
The following 12 encyclicals of Leo XIII are about the Rosary:
 Supremi apostolatus officio
 Superiore anno
 Quod auctoritate
 Vi è ben noto
 Octobri mense
 Magnae dei matris
 Laetitiae sanctae
 Iucunda Semper Expectatione
 Adiutricem populi
 Fidentem Piumque
 Augustissimae Virginis
 Diuturni temporis

See also
List of encyclicals of Pope Leo XIII
Ingruentium malorum

References

Rosary
Encyclicals of Pope Leo XIII